Santiago de Ávila de María (born 27 September 1993) is a Uruguayan footballer who is last known to have played as a defender for Atenas.

Career

Before the second half of 2013/14, de Ávila signed for Plaza Colonia in the Uruguayan second division after playing for the youth academy of Peñarol, Uruguay's most successful club, where he made 45 league appearances and scored 1 goal, suffering an injury and helping them win the 2016 Uruguayan top flight title after promotion After that, he signed for Uruguayan lower league side Juventud de Colonia but suffered an injury.

References

External links

 
 

Uruguayan footballers
Living people
1993 births
People from Colonia del Sacramento
Uruguayan Primera División players
Uruguayan Segunda División players
Association football defenders
Miramar Misiones players
Club Plaza Colonia de Deportes players
Montevideo City Torque players
Atenas de San Carlos players